Vobarilizumab (INN; development code ALX0061) is a humanized bispecific nanobody (Llama-derived heavy-chain only (Vhh) antibody) designed for the treatment of inflammatory autoimmune diseases.

This drug was developed by Ablynx NV to block interleukin-6 receptor. Vobarilizumab has been evaluated in patients with rheumatoid arthritis as well as in Lupus.

References 

Monoclonal antibodies